Moshe Marzouk (or Musa Lieto Marzuk, ; born 20 December 1926 – 31 January 1955) was an Egyptian Karaite Jew, hanged in 1955 for his involvement in a series of bombings in Cairo codenamed Operation Suzannah.

Marzouk was born in Cairo to a Karaite family who had emigrated from Tunisia in the early 20th century, though they retained French citizenship. While working as a surgeon at the Jewish Hospital in Cairo in the early 1950s, he was recruited as a spy by Israeli military intelligence, along with other young Egyptian Jews. In 1954 the group carried out a series of bombings, targeting the post office in Alexandria, two libraries in Cairo and Alexandria, and a movie theatre. There were no casualties. These actions triggered an Israeli political crisis later known as the Lavon Affair. Marzouk and his group were caught and tried, during which time they were allegedly tortured. Marzouk was executed in a Cairo prison. His remains were brought to Jerusalem and buried on Mount Herzl.

See also
 Lavon Affair
 History of the Jews in Egypt

References

External links
The Lavon Affair" by Doron Geller, Jewish Virtual Library
The Lavon Affair: Israel and Terror in Egypt, Mideastweb.org

1926 births
1955 deaths
Karaite Jews
Mizrahi Jews
Egyptian Jews
Egyptian people convicted of spying for Israel
Terrorism in Egypt
Egypt–Israel relations
People executed by Egypt by hanging
Executed Egyptian people
People from Cairo
Executed spies
Burials at Mount Herzl
20th-century executions by Egypt
Egyptian people of Tunisian descent